Clément-Talbot Limited was a British motor vehicle manufacturer with its works in Ladbroke Grove, North Kensington, London, founded in 1903. The new business's capital was arranged by Charles Chetwynd-Talbot (whose family name became the brand-name and whose family crest became the trademark), shareholders included automobile manufacturer, Adolphe Clément, along with Baron A. Lucas and Emile Lamberjack, all of France.

The shareholders sold it in late 1919 to the company that became S.T.D. Motors. It kept its separate identity making cars designed specially for it or by its employees until 1934. After S.T.D.s financial collapse it was bought by the Rootes brothers. When Rootes acquired Clement-Talbot's parent company Darracq & Co. in 1935, it kept the Talbot name as a brand, then establishing Sunbeam-Talbot Limited in 1938.

Origin 
The first Talbots, re-badged Clément-Bayards built in France, were sold by the British Automobile Commercial Syndicate Limited, manager Daniel M. Weigel, from the Earl's premises at 97–98 Long Acre, which included Maison Talbot, importers of Michelin tyres. The earl's flourishing business was the importation, distribution through a large British network and retailing of many brands of European motor cars and associated products. These included: Panhard, Hotchkiss, Mors and Clément-Gladiator cars. This business brought about the close association with businessman Adolphe Clément, and in April 1902 the Earl became the agent for Clement cars. By 1903 his car imports from France exceeded £2,000,000. The earl closed this business in 1909, when its only advertised brand was Spyker, because it seemed to be foolish to compete with his own Talbot dealers.

The housing estate now on the site has Shrewsbury Street as its main access-way.

Clément-Talbot Works

Production 

Weigel was appointed managing director and C. R. Garrard works manager of Clément-Talbot. Kensington assembly got under way in 1904 initially using imported components. In December 1904 speaking at their annual trade dinner in the presence of all directors the Earl described Clément-Talbot as "partly-controlled by French interests". At that time production was entirely British made except for the engines imported from France. The first wholly British designs were made in 1907. However, in 1908 the opportunity was taken to equip new cars with a very successful new Clément-Bayard engine of L-head design with greatly improved performance. Its more compact combustion chamber gave faster ignition and allowed higher compression ratios. Talbots could now match, even beat Vauxhalls and Sunbeams in competition

Cars offered by Clément-Talbot London (1904–1916) 
Cars made in France are marked with an asterisk
Information assembled from The Autocar Buyer's Guide and published in Appendix V, Ian Nickols and Kent Karslake, Motoring Entente, Cassell, London 1956

Sold out 
In autumn 1919 A Darracq and Company (1905) agreed terms for their purchase of all the shares in Clément-Talbot as of 31 July 1918. Auguste Oddenino, Regent Street restaurateur and businessman was, by then, a major shareholder in Clément-Talbot. Adolphe Clémente-Bayard's Levallois factory did not flourish after the Armistice of 11 November 1918. He lost interest in motor manufacturing. In 1921 he sold his works at Levallois to André Citroën, while the Earl of Shrewsbury and Talbot died the same year.

In 1920 London's Darracq added Sunbeam Motor Car Company to its enterprise and renamed itself S.T.D. Motors. Shareholders and subsequent commentators were at loss to explain the commercial advantages given by the combination. Each of the three companies continued to operate independently. S.T.D.'s products were made in respectively, Wolverhampton, London and Paris. Anthony Blight believes Coatalen was drawn back to full-time efforts at S.T.D. by the possibility of racing cars under three brand names and of two nationalities. He had not long retired from his chief engineer post at Sunbeam and was now a design consultant in Paris in his native France.

Automobiles Talbot Suresnes 

The process of dropping the Darracq name for the Paris products was begun in early 1919 when new cars were badged Talbot-Darracq. In 1920 Darracq was dropped altogether from Talbot-Darracq. Owen Clegg at Suresnes, Paris, would design new cars to be built in Suresnes and Kensington.

Louis Coatalen who had remained a director of S.T.D. joined S.T.D. Motors as chief engineer and blocked Clegg's new designs. Coatalen's principal interest was a new Sunbeam racing car and, of course, a whole new range of products for Wolverhampton and Paris. Kensington would have to build a small car for the utility market. The new utility Talbot would be designed in Paris by Coatalen's freshly assembled team.

Clément-Talbot London continue 
At first the Kensington factory kept its employees busy converting wartime ambulances to Talbot touring cars. When that ran out they had to revert to their prewar models, which were luxury cars and almost impossible to sell in the new slump of mid-1920. They were asked to build the two new 3-litre straight eight S.T.D. Grand Prix cars and a 1½-litre variant – all to wear a Talbot radiator.

Post war designs 
8-18 a Paris design
a small fast chic "utility" car it sold only to country doctors and professional men. The lively 970 cc engine ran very sweetly. Designed in Paris its lack of a differential burst tyres broke spring mountings and gave drivers humiliating battles at corners. It was also fifty per cent too expensive for the "utility" class. A made-in-Barlby-Road Talbot it also turned up from Acton (W & G Du Cros) with a different-shaped radiator as a locally assembled Suresnes Darracq.
10-23 a Roesch amelioration
a bored out 8-18 engine, 1074 cc, a differential, a longer and stronger wheelbase and chassis with the back springs properly tied on. 2½ cwt heavier,  it was slower but seated four. It was a commercial success.
12-30 the first Talbot Six and another Paris design
an 8-18 with two more cylinders, 1454 cc. Weight and price were both up 75 per cent, power up 50 per cent. Mitigated by "delightful" gearbox, and light and accurate controls. Further mitigated the following year by an increased bore so its capacity was now 1612 cc. Neither popular nor successful it is only remembered for being the first Talbot Six.

Cars built by Clément-Talbot London (1919–1938) 
Information assembled from The Autocar Buyer's Guide and published in Appendix V, Ian Nickols and Kent Karslake, Motoring Entente, Cassell, London 1956

Some of the last true Talbots

Notes

References

External links 

 The specially-built Barlby Road Works, North Kensington about 1930
 Image of 1903 Clement-Talbot Type CT4K at Bonhams auction. 18HP Four cylinder, 'Roi-D'Italie Tonneau. Coachwork by J.Rothschild et Fils, Paris Registration no. AP 107. Sold for £606,300
 Video of Percy Lambert's world record at Brooklands 15 February 1913

Talbot
Defunct motor vehicle manufacturers of England
Vehicle manufacturing companies established in 1903
Motor vehicle manufacturers based in London
Vintage vehicles
Brass Era vehicles